The 2015–16 season is Bury's first season back in League One since relegation in 2012–13 season after gaining promotion the previous season It is also their 131st year in existence. Along with competing in League One, the club will also participate in the FA Cup, League Cup and JP Trophy. The season covers the period from 1 July 2015 to 30 June 2016.

Transfers

Transfers in

Transfers out

Loans in

Loans out

Competitions

Pre–season friendlies
On 16 June 2015, Bury announced their confirmed pre–season fixtures.

League One

League table

Matches
On 17 June 2015, the fixtures for the forthcoming season were announced.

FA Cup

League Cup

Football League Trophy

Lancashire Senior Cup

References

Bury
Bury F.C. seasons